Yagong Island is an island in the Crescent Group (Yongle Qundao 永乐环礁) of the Paracel Islands, in the South China Sea.  It is also known as "He Duck", (male duck), due to its shape.  It is located a few hundred metres southwest of Observation Bank (Silver Islet, Yin Yu, Bãi Xà Cừ) in the northeast of the Crescent Group.

It is occupied by the PRC, and like all of the other Paracel islands, it is controlled by China (PRC) and claimed by Taiwan (ROC) and Vietnam.

It is administered as the "Yagong Community", a village-level division of the Yongxing Dao Neighborhood Committee township-level division, in the county-level division of the Xisha District, of the Sansha prefecture-level city, in the Hainan province.

It has an area of just under 1 hectare and a residential population of about 100 fishermen with solar power and a desalination plant.

Prior to 2013 the island was a barren stretch of coral and clamshells surrounding a central lagoon, providing a temporary stopover and resting place for fishermen. In 2013 the PRC shipped 120 tonnes of soil, 200 tonnes of fresh water, coconut fibre, and 400 trees to the island as part of a Sansha-wide greening project.  As of 2013, regular tourist visits were made to the island by a cruise line, which also supplies the 78 registered (in 2016) residents with groceries.

References

Paracel Islands
Villages in China
Disputed territories in Asia
Territorial disputes of Vietnam
Territorial disputes of China
Territorial disputes of the Republic of China